The Lochsa River is in the northwestern United States, in the mountains of north central Idaho.  It is one of two primary tributaries (with the Selway to the south) of the Middle Fork of the Clearwater River in the Clearwater National Forest. Lochsa is a Nez Perce word meaning rough water. The Salish name is Ep Smɫí, "It Has Salmon."

The Lochsa (pronounced "lock-saw") was included by the U.S. Congress in 1968 as part of the National Wild and Scenic Rivers  The Lochsa and Selway rivers and their tributaries have no dams, and their flow is unregulated. In late spring (mid-May to mid-June), the Lochsa River is rated as one of the world's best for continuous whitewater.

The river is fed by the melting of the significant snowpack of the Bitterroot Range, among the highest precipitation areas

Course
Running parallel to U.S. Route 12 for its entire length, the river winds through the Clearwater National Forest in the Bitterroot Mountains. Just below Lowell, the Lochsa and the Selway River join to form the Middle Fork Clearwater River.

At its point of formation just west of Elk Summit Road 360, the Lochsa receives a small tributary, Walton Creek, from the left. The creek flows through the Powell adult salmon trap before entering the river. Slightly downstream from the salmon station, the Lochsa passes White Sand Campground on the right. About  later, it flows by the Powell Ranger Station and heliport and, shortly thereafter, Lochsa Lodge and Powell Campground, all on the right, and receives Cliff Creek and Jay Creek, both from the left.

Eagle Creek enters from the left about  later, and Badger Creek from the right  further on. About  down from Badger Creek the river receives Waw'aalamnine (Squaw) Creek from the right.

Over the next , the river receives Skookum Creek from the right, Stanley Creek from the left, and Castle Creek from the right, passes Green Flat Campground and Nine Mile Rest Area, both on the right, receives Bald Mountain Creek from the right, and Dutch Creek and Hard Creek from the left. Just below  from the mouth, the Lochsa receives Pass Creek from the right and over the next  receives No-See-Um Creek, Dipper Creek, and Sherman Creek, all from the right,  then Lone Knob Creek from the left, passes Wilderness Gateway Campground on the left and Boulder Flat on the right, receives Boulder Creek from the left, passes the Lochsa Work Center on the right; receives Sardine Creek, Fish Creek, Bee Creek, Eel Creek, and Otter Slide Creek, all from the right, then passes Beaver Flat on the right and receives Big Stew Creek from the left and Snowshoe Creek from the right.

Over its last , the river passes Glade Creek Campground and receives Glade Creek, both on the right, passes Apgar Campground and receives Apgar Creek, both on the right, receives Chance Creek from the left, Canyon Creek from the right, Hellgate Creek and Handy Creek, both from the left, Rye Patch Creek from the right, Cat Creek and Kerr Creek, both from the left, Pete King Creek from the right, passes Icicle Spring on the right, receives Lowell Creek from the right, passes a United States Geological Survey (USGS) stream gage  from the mouth, receives Lottie Creek from the left, passes the town of Lowell on the left, passes under the Lowell Bridge, and meets the Selway River.

Downstream from Lowell, the Middle Fork of the Clearwater River flows west, meets the South and North Forks, and enters the Snake River at Lewiston on the Idaho—Washington border,  by river from Lowell. Below Lewiston, the Snake flows  to its confluence with the Columbia River just south of the Tri-Cities. Over this stretch, four dams in Washington block the Snake. They are the Lower Granite Dam, Little Goose Dam, Lower Monumental Dam, and Ice Harbor Dam, in that order.

History 
Long before the arrival of European Americans in the 19th century, the Nez Perce people in Idaho used the trail along the Lochsa River to travel to the plains of Montana to hunt buffalo. Kootenai and Salish (Flatheads) from Montana used the river trail to reach salmon runs in the rivers and streams feeding into the Columbia basin.

During mid-September 1805, the explorers Lewis and Clark traveled westward along the Lolo Trail, descending into and out of the Lochsa Gorge, then above its north rim.  They described the region near the modern-day ranger station at Powell as follows:

They experienced significant early season snowfall and suffered near starvation before exiting the mountains onto the Weippe Prairie, where they first encountered the Nez Perce tribe.

The United States Forest Service has sometimes leased public lands in the Lochsa watershed for timber extraction. Since 2008, the Forest Service has been considering a swap, the Upper Lochsa Land Exchange, with Western Pacific Timber. The land exchange has generated controversy about impacts it might have on water quality and wildlife in the basin. Other issues related to the proposed exchange have involved its effects on the Idaho County tax base, how to calculate the value of the lands being traded, and other economic concerns.

U.S. Route 12 
Route 12 follows the Lochsa River along its north bank. One of the last two-lane U.S. highways constructed, it was completed in the early 1960s, connecting Lewiston with Missoula over Lolo Pass.  Two railroads, the Northern Pacific and Union Pacific, had originally planned to ascend the Lochsa; the Northern won the rights and even completed some grades in 1908, but abandoned the project in 1909. The highway along the river was not completed for another 50 years.

In the 21st century, shippers have proposed sending loads as wide as both lanes of Route 12 and up to three stories high from the river port at Lewiston to inland destinations, including the Kearl Oil Sands Project in Alberta, Canada. In June 2012, after several groups had filed lawsuits to prevent the shipments, Imperial Oil and Exxon Mobil withdrew their application to use the highway for such large loads.

Wildlife 
Common among the animals using the Lochsa River watershed are deer, elk, black bear, on the hillsides and moose in meadows and wet places. Among the birds along the river are Canada geese, swans, eagles, osprey and great blue herons. Wild turkeys are seen at lower elevations. More rare are mountain lions, snow geese, mountain goats, and harlequin ducks. cutthroat trout, rainbow trout, chinook salmon and steelhead are among the fish living in the river.

Recreation 

Kayakers and whitewater rafters run the Lochsa, generally between April and June. The "Lochsa River Floating Guide" lists more than 60 rapids between Powell and Lowell, most of which are rated Class III-IV (medium to difficult). Depending on the discharge rate, the level of difficulty can rise in places to Class VI (the limits of navigation) on the International Scale of River Difficulty. The gage at the bridge differs from the USGS gage. A warning to whitewater rafters posted at the USGS web site for its gage says: "This stage reading is from the USGS gaging station 0.7 miles upstream from Lowell bridge, and it may read between 2-3 feet higher than the stage reading on the staff gage at Lowell bridge. This [the USGS gage reading] is not the stage reference to float the Lochsa River." The USGS site advises rafters to check with the Lochsa Ranger District for readings from the bridge.

The "Floating Guide" describes the Class VI rapids at Castle Creek as follows:

Probably the largest, most technical rapid on the river. A long, twisting rapid whose 1/2-mile length is not totally observable from the water at any one time. Large holes become large waves at high water, and everything pillows left off a huge block of bedrock at the bottom of the rapid. Considered un-runnable at high flows. Must scout. Cannot be seen from highway.

Commercial outfitters offer pre-arranged trips, and people with sufficient technical expertise run the rapids on their own. River access points with parking lots along Highway 12 are at the following sites and highway mile markers: Knife Edge, 107; Split Creek, 111; Fish Creek, 119; Nine Mile, 130, and White Pine, 138. Recreational boaters in search of an outfitter should be aware that there are only five current commercial outfitters. Contact the Lochsa-Powell Ranger District within the United States Forest Service for more information. 

Other recreation in the watershed includes backcountry skiing, bicycling on part of the TransAmerica Trail or other roads and trails, fly fishing with daily limits or catch-and-release rules, hiking, swimming, camping, and picnicking.

See also 
List of rivers of Idaho
List of longest streams of Idaho
List of National Wild and Scenic Rivers

References

Further reading
Endangered and Threatened Wildlife and Plants; Proposed Designation of Critical Habitat for the Klamath River and Columbia River Distinct Population Segments of Bull Trout. Washington D.C.; U.S. Fish and Wildlife Service. Office of Endangered Species, 2002
Hazelbaker, Kris (2004). Caring for a wild and scenic river In: Shepperd, Wayne D.; Eskew, Lane G., compilers. 2004. Silviculture in special places: Proceedings of the National Silviculture Workshop; September 8–11, 2003; Granby, CO. Proceedings RMRS-P-34. Fort Collins, CO: U.S. Department of Agriculture, Forest Service, Rocky Mountain Research Station. pp. 207–16.
Moore, W. R. (1996). The Lochsa story - Land Ethics In The Bitterroot Mountains. Missoula, Montana: Mountain Publishing Co.

External links 
Three Rivers Rafting - Custom Lochsa Raft Trips
The Weather Channel - Epic Adventures - Lochsa River, Idaho
Lochsa.info - stream flows, weather, etc.
Backcountry Secrets.com - Lochsa River, Idaho
Idaho Whitewater Trail Map - official state tourism site
Paddling.net - Lochsa River, Idaho
Kayak Idaho.com - photos - Idaho rivers
ROW Adventures.com - Lochsa River
Rafting Adventures.com - Lochsa River
Lewis and Clark Trail Adventures - Lochsa River
Lochsa Historical Ranger Station Museum
Mammoth River Adventures - Idaho - Whitewater Rafting Trips - Lochsa, Selway, & Clearwater Rivers

Rivers of Idaho
Canyons and gorges of Idaho
Wild and Scenic Rivers of the United States
Rivers of Idaho County, Idaho
Bitterroot Range
Clearwater National Forest